This Week Live is an Australian comedy chat show screening weekly on Network Ten from 24 July 2013. It is hosted by comedians Dave Thornton, Tommy Little, Tom Gleeson and Meshel Laurie. The show features discussions of topical subjects, guests on the panel and pre-recorded interviews and skits. The show is created and produced by Craig Campbell, Kevin Whyte, Tom Whitty and Hayden Guppy.

Rove McManus, Charlie Pickering and Peter Helliar have been guest panelists.

Segments
Regular segments include:
 "I Hate You, Now Change My Mind", where a controversial politician or person in the media is interviewed by Tom Gleeson
 "Twit Pics", where photos of twits from Twitter are shared
 "Regional News"
 "Sport Report"

References

Network 10 original programming
Australian television talk shows
2013 Australian television series debuts
2013 Australian television series endings
Television shows set in Victoria (Australia)